Bentfield may refer to the following places in Essex, England:

Bentfield Bury
Bentfield Green